Tanypleurus is a monotypic genus of crustaceans belonging to the monotypic family Tanypleuridae. The only species is Tanypleurus alcicornis.

References

Siphonostomatoida
Copepod genera
Monotypic crustacean genera